L'accademia di musica was a farsa for the Teatro di San Samuele in 1800 by Johann Simon Mayr.

Recording
Johann Simon Mayr: l'Accademia Di Musica ('the Academy of Music') Passionart Orchestra, Andrés Jesús Gallucci, Filippo Morace, César Cortés, Eleonora Bellocci, Ricardo Seguel, Maria Del Mar Humanes, Filippo Pina Castiglioni, Nicola Pascoli 2022 Naxos Length: 75 minutes

References

1800 operas

Operas
Operas by Simon Mayr